Saltburn Gill is an  biological Site of Special Scientific Interest in Redcar and Cleveland district, in the ceremonial county of North Yorkshire, England. The site was notified in 1986.

In May 1999, the colour of the water in Saltburn Gill turned orange overnight. An investigation found the cause to be rising water levels in the abandoned Longacres Ironstone Mine in Skelton-in-Cleveland. A remediation programme was undertaken throughout the 2000s and 2010s, which resulted in clear water and fish returning to the gill in 2016.

References

External links
 English Nature (SSSI information)
 Site boundary map at English Nature's "Nature on the Map" website

Sites of Special Scientific Interest in Cleveland, England
Sites of Special Scientific Interest notified in 1986